Tisis chalybaeella is a moth in the family Lecithoceridae. It was described by Francis Walker in 1864. It is found on Borneo.

Adults are cupreous, the forewings ochraceous, with three chalybeous (steel-blue) stripes, which extend from the base to beyond the middle, and are connected at their tips. The marginal band and fringe are chalybeous. The hindwings are cupreous brown.

References

Moths described in 1864
Tisis